Queen of the Arena is a 1952 West German musical drama film directed by Rolf Meyer and starring Maria Litto, Hans Söhnker and Jan Hendriks. It contains elements of both the revue film and the circus film genres. It was shot at the Bendestorf Studios near Hamburg and on location around Sorrento in Italy. The film's sets were designed by the art director Franz Schroedter.

Cast
 Maria Litto as Margarita, Tänzerin
 Hans Söhnker as Professor Gerhart Mahnke, Bildhauer
 Jan Hendriks as Tonio, Artist
 Grethe Weiser as Constance Caselli, Zirkusdirektorin
 Paul Kemp as Fritz Zwickel, Faktotum Mahnkes
 Camilla Horn as Diana Bianca, Dompteuse
 Peter Alexander as Singer
 Horst Beck as Manegeclown
 Erwin Bredow as Dancer
 Bully Buhlan as Singer
 Lonny Kellner as Singer
 Helmut Ketels as Dancer
 Ernesto Kühne as Dresseur
 Bruce Low as Singer
 Michael Piel as Dancer
 Guenter Schnittjer as Singer
 Max Walter Sieg
 Jockel Stahl as Dancer
 Fred Weyrich as Singer
 Horst Winter as Singer
 Helmut Zacharias as Dirigent

References

Bibliography 
 Hans-Michael Bock and Tim Bergfelder. The Concise Cinegraph: An Encyclopedia of German Cinema. Berghahn Books, 2009.

External links 
 

1952 films
1950s musical drama films
German musical drama films
West German films
1950s German-language films
Films directed by Rolf Meyer
Circus films
Films based on works by Gerhart Hauptmann
Films based on German novels
1952 drama films
German black-and-white films
1950s German films
Films shot in Italy